Aman Wote Fete (Amharic: አማን ወጤ; born 18 April 1984) is an Ethiopian runner who specializes in mostly middle-distance events. He represented Ethiopia at the 2012 Summer Olympics.

Running career
A late bloomer in the international stage, although a prolific runner from an early age in Kabet, Wote ran his first big international race at the 2010 African Championships, where he ran the 1500 metres in 3:38.89. At the 2012 Summer Olympics, Wote ran the 1500 metres in 3:41.67, missing qualification to the next round by less than 0.3 seconds.

Achievements

References

External links

1984 births
Living people
Ethiopian male middle-distance runners
Athletes (track and field) at the 2012 Summer Olympics
Olympic athletes of Ethiopia
World Athletics Championships athletes for Ethiopia
Athletes (track and field) at the 2011 All-Africa Games
African Games competitors for Ethiopia
21st-century Ethiopian people